Montenegro also known as Montenegro – Or Pigs and Pearls is a 1981 Swedish black comedy film by Serbian director Dušan Makavejev.

Plot
Marilyn Jordan is a bored, depressed American housewife, married to a rich Swedish businessman with two seemingly perfect children. She tries to "spice up" her existence by surprising the family when she eats their entire dinner, setting the bedclothes on fire and poisoning the pet dog's milk and then advising it not to drink (the dog does not drink). Eventually Martin, Marilyn's husband, decides to have a psychiatrist see her, but it only serves to provoke her behaviour, and further exacerbate her frustration.

One day, Marilyn decides to accompany her husband on a business trip, but she gets detained by airport security on a technicality.

After missing her plane, Marilyn is befriended by a group of Yugoslavs, and is taken to a club they run, bearing the odd name of 'Zanzi-Bar'. Marilyn indulges in their fantastic, surreal world of shovel fighting, lamb roasting, striptease and free love. It all culminates with Marilyn having a passionate fling with a young man named Montenegro who works in a zoo.

After spending the night with Montenegro, Marilyn realizes that even though she adores this world, she is a stranger in it. Completely snapping upon this realization, she kills the young man and returns home.

Once back home, Marilyn serves her family a sumptuous gourmet dinner, followed by a light dessert of fruit – which a caption announces is poisoned. The final intertitle states; "the story was based on real events".

Cast
 Susan Anspach - Marilyn
 Erland Josephson - Martin Jordan
 Marianna Jacobi - Cookie Jordan
 Jamie Marsh - Jimmy Jordan
 John Zacharias - Grandpa Bill
 Per Oscarsson - Dr. Aram Pazardjian
 Marina Lindahl - Secretary
 Bora Todorović - Alex Rossignol
 Lisbeth Zachrisson - Rita Rossignol
 Svetozar Cvetković - Montenegro
  - Tirke
 Dragan Ilić - Hassan
 Nikola Janić - Mustapha
 Mile Petrović - Zanzi Bar Customer
 John Parkinson - Piano Player

Reception
On Rotten Tomatoes the film has an approval rating of 88% based on reviews from 16 critics.

Roger Ebert of the Chicago Sun-Times gave it a 4 out of 4 and wrote: "There can be something absolutely liberating about a movie that makes up its rules as it goes along."

Vincent Canby of The New York Times gave it a negative review, and called it "A halfheartedly Surreal comedy filled with forced high spirits, unconvincing lunacies and failed sight gags."

Awards
Montenegro was nominated for the Golden Palm Award at the 1981 Cannes Film Festival; it gained Audience Award and Mostra Special Award at São Paulo International Film Festival

Music
Marianne Faithfull sings "The Ballad of Lucy Jordan" over the opening credit sequence

References

External links
 

1981 films
Swedish satirical films
English-language Swedish films
Political satire films
Swedish political satire
1980s sex comedy films
Swedish black comedy films
Films directed by Dušan Makavejev
1981 comedy films
1980s English-language films
1980s Swedish films